Tarso is a town and municipality in Antioquia Department, Colombia.  It lies in the subregion of Southwestern Antioquia.

History
In 2000, in Tarso, the AUC executed Luis Emilio Corrales Londoño, the head of the community action committee El Cedrón.

References

Municipalities of Antioquia Department